The 1936–37 OB I bajnokság season was the first season of the OB I bajnokság, the top level of ice hockey in Hungary. Three teams participated in the league, and BKE Budapest won the championship.

Regular season

External links
 Season on hockeyarchives.info

Hun
OB I bajnoksag seasons
1936–37 in Hungarian ice hockey